Park Kyu-hyun (born 14 April 2001) is a South Korean professional footballer who plays as a left-back for 3. Liga club Dynamo Dresden, on loan from Werder Bremen.

Career

Park started his career with German Bundesliga side Werder Bremen. In 2022, he was sent on loan to Dynamo Dresden in the German third tier. On 23 July 2022, Park debuted for Dynamo Dresden during a 4–3 loss to 1860 Munich.

References

External links
 
 
  

Living people
2001 births
People from Seosan
South Korean footballers
Association football fullbacks
3. Liga players
Regionalliga players
SV Werder Bremen players
SV Werder Bremen II players
Dynamo Dresden players
South Korean expatriate footballers
South Korean expatriate sportspeople in Germany
Expatriate footballers in Germany